For 1977 in television, see:

1977 in American television
1977 in Australian television
1977 in Austrian television
1977 in Belgian television
1977 in Brazilian television
1977 in British television
1977 in Canadian television
1977 in Croatian television
1977 in Danish television
1977 in Dutch television
1977 in Estonian television
1977 in French television
1977 in Irish television
1977 in Japanese television
1977 in New Zealand television
1977 in Scottish television
1977 in Singapore television
1977 in South African television